The barred lambda ƛ, (in Unicode ), also called running man, is a modified letter of the Greek alphabet used in Americanist phonetic notation to transcribe . It was introduced in American Anthropologist in 1934:

It is also commonly used to represent this phoneme in several languages of the Caucasus. A barred lambda is used in transcribing the Sahaptin language, e.g., iƛúpna ‘he jumped’.  It occurs there less frequently than its ejective counterpart, e.g., iƛ’úna ‘he guessed right (in the bone game)’.

In physics, it is used to represent the angular wavelength, i.e. the wavelength (λ) divided by 2π, which corresponds to the length taken up by one radian of the wave.

References

Latin-script letters
Phonetic transcription symbols